The Very Best of Elton John is a greatest hits compilation album by English musician Elton John, released in October 1990. His first career-retrospective compilation album, and fourth official greatest-hits album overall, it was released in the United Kingdom and throughout Europe, and in other countries such as Japan and Australia, but not in the United States, where the box set To Be Continued... was released the following month instead.

The compilation spans his second album Elton John in 1970 to Sleeping with the Past in 1989. After the double A-sided "Sacrifice/Healing Hands" single became a hit and the third best-selling single of 1990 in the United Kingdom, the album became an instant smash in that country. It spent its first two weeks at #1 followed by nine weeks at #2, kept there by Madonna's Immaculate Collection. In all, the compilation spent 145 weeks inside the UK top 200 album chart, making a total of 11 re-entries, and it was certified 9× Platinum by the BPI on 1 March 1995.

It includes a total of 28 hit singles plus the new songs "Easier to Walk Away" and "You Gotta Love Someone", both of which also made the charts between 1990 and 1991. The release also spawned a music video compilation, which was originally released on both laserdisc and VHS, and reissued on DVD.

Track listing
Disc one

Disc two

Track 25 is different on European version of the album. "Whispers" from Sleeping with the Past takes the place of "Passengers".
"Pinball Wizard", "The Bitch Is Back", "I Don't Wanna Go on With You Like That" and "Easier to Walk Away" are excised from the vinyl version of the compilation.
The timings are different on the back cover and the actual CD. On Disc 1, "Don't Let the Sun Go Down on Me" is listed as 6:12, while the actual song runs at 5:38 and "Philadelphia Freedom" runs at 5:42, rather at 5:19. On Disc 2, the back cover shows Song For Guy running at 5:02, but the actual track runs at 6:40 (the album length of the song). The same applies for "Nikita", which the back cover states for 4:53 but the actual song plays at 5:44. "I Don't Wanna Go on With You Like That" is the radio single edit on the CD (4:00) instead of the back cover's album cut listing of 4:33.

B-sides

Music video compilation
 "Your Song" (Top of the Pops 1971 live version)
 "Daniel" (Top of the Pops 1973 live version)
 "Goodbye Yellow Brick Road" (Top of the Pops 1973 live version)
 "Don't Go Breaking My Heart" (with Kiki Dee)
 "Sorry Seems to Be the Hardest Word" (BBC Live Christmas Show version)
 "Rocket Man (I Think It's Going to Be a Long Long Time)" (live Wembley 1977 version)
 "Blue Eyes"
 "I Guess That's Why They Call It the Blues"
 "I'm Still Standing"
 "Kiss the Bride"
 "Sad Songs (Say So Much)"
 "Passengers"
 "Nikita"
 "Wrap Her Up"
 "Candle in the Wind" (live in Australia 1986 version)
 "Saturday Night's Alright for Fighting"  (live in Prince's Trust 1987 version)
 "I Don't Wanna Go on with You Like That"
 "Philadelphia Freedom" (live in Verona 1989 version)
 "Sacrifice"
 "You Gotta Love Someone"

Charts

Weekly charts

Year-end charts

Certifications and sales

References

1990 greatest hits albums
Elton John compilation albums
Albums produced by Gus Dudgeon
Albums recorded at Trident Studios
Albums produced by Chris Thomas (record producer)
Albums produced by Don Was